Julau is a town, and the capital of the Julau District (1703.39 square kilometres) in Sarikei Division, Sarawak, Malaysia. The district population (year 2020 census) is 15, 333. The population is dominated by Iban as well as Chinese especially the Fuzhou.

Etymology

History
In 1853, James Brooke was able to take over Rajang River and its surrounding settlements from the Brunei Sultanate. A person from Xiamen named Limah Din (林结麟) was the first Chinese to arrive in Julau in 1929. He settled near the mouth of the Julau river and started acres of rubber plantations. He then used his home to start a trade business with the natives in Julau. In memory of his role in opening up Julau, a road is now named after him as Limah Din road. The Chinese started business activities in 1936 at the mouth of the Julau river between Julau and Nanga Meluan. In the same year, the Brooke government set up a fort at a hill in Meluan in order to defend itself from the Iban attacks led by Penghulu Asun. In 1938, the Brooke government formally put Julau under the jurisdiction of Ng Meluan. The trading of rubber sheets and Engkabang fruits (Shorea macrophylla) between the Iban and the Chinese was the major economic activity in Julau.

During the Japanese occupation of Sarawak, there were some Iban people who took advantage of the power vacuum and went downriver and perform raiding activities. Therefore, the Chinese in Julau decided to cooperate with other more friendly Ibans to start patrolling and protecting the people. Besides, several Ibans decided to let the Chinese to open up their lands for the cultivation of rice, corn, and tobacco. In 1953, the Bao Hua cinema (宝华戏院）was opened. However, in 1980s, due to the wide of availability of television sets, the cinema was closed down. In 1954, there were 22 shophouses in Julau. However, in 1965, all the shophouses were burnt down in a fire; while the land where the shophouses were built are left abandoned today. In 1955, a hospital, a telephone department, and a village council was set up. In 1957, a dormitory for the civil servants was built. In 1957, the first row of five concrete shophouses were built. In the same year, the Julau village council started to install power station, electrical wires, and light bulbs, replacing oil lamps. Motorboat companies were set up to connect Julau with other towns along the Rajang River such as Machan, Kanowit, and Sibu. In 1960, Julau businessmen started a pipe water project where river water was pumped into shophouses and homes. The water project was later taken over by the government water board.

In 1963, Malaysia was formed. Road conditions were improved. This significantly shorten the travelling time from Julau to Sarikei and Sibu. In 1970s, Julau bridge was built. Motorboat companies have to close down their businesses due to reducing number of customers. In 1967, the first government secondary school in Julau was set up. Students from other rural areas such as Entabai, Pakan, and Meluan came to study here. In 1970s, Julau water board, telephone department, agriculture department and police department were built. Previously, Julau was a sub-district under the jurisdiction of Kanowit District. In 1973, Julau was upgraded into a district and is put under the administration of Sarikei Division.

Government

 Julau District Office
 Julau Sub-District Education Department
 Julau District Agriculture Department
 Julau District Police Station
 Julau District Health Department
 Julau District Public Works Department
 Julau District Information Department
 Meradong-Julau District Council
 Julau District National Registration Department
 Julau District Social Welfare Department
 Julau Cooperative Development Department
 Julau District KEMAS Office
 Julau District Post Office
 Julau District RELA Office
 Julau District SESCO
 Julau District Telekom Malaysia

Geography
Julau is located at the intersection of Kanowit and Julau rivers. Julau is located at  66 km from Sarikei town, 48 km from Bintangor, 39 km from Kanowit, and 60 km from Sibu. Floods happen in the Julau town in January 1968, January 1989, December 1993, January 2003, December 2011, and March 2021.

Climate
Julau has a tropical rainforest climate (Af) with heavy to very heavy rainfall year-round.

Demographics

The first Christian missionary in Julau was spread by Liu Yang Xin (刘杨馨) in 1946 when she completed her studies at Singapore Nanyang Girls' High School. She started a Sunday school during her free time. However, the Sunday school stopped operating when she was transferred back to Singapore Nanyang Nanyang Girls' High School in the end of the same year. After that, intermittent Christian missionaries were sent here from 1948 to 1950. Only in 1958, a permanent christian missionary was tasked to visit Julau once or twice a month to host Sunday worship services. In 1971, Julau Methodist Church was established. A Methodist kinder-garden was established in 1988.

Place of Worship
Christian
 Julau St. Alphonsus Catholic Church
 Julau Methodist Church
 Julau Centre Seventh-day Adventist Church
 Nanga Luau Seventh-day Adventist Church
 Nanga Ejit Seventh-day Adventist Church
 Nanga Ayam Seventh-day Adventist Church
 Nanga Lijan Seventh-day Adventist Church
 Nanga Merurun Seventh-day Adventist Church
 Nanga Udur Seventh-day Adventist Church
 Nanga Rayah Seventh-day Adventist Church

Muslim
 Nurul Hidayah Mosque

Economy
Major economic activities in Julau are: black pepper, rubber, rice, and fruits farming. Other economic activities include: retail, logging, and services. Julau is better known for its black pepper production.

Transport

For people from rural areas, their major mode of transport to Julau is plying through the rivers.
Land
Public Bus
 Borneo Almagated Sdn. Bhd
Personal Vehicles
 Today, most of Julau people have their own personal transportation, such as car, motorcycle and van to travel to their destination.
Water
There are many remote places in Julau that have not reachable yet with land transportation and boat is the only solution for them to go there.

Other utilities

Education
The first primary school in Julau was set up in 1946, named Wen Ming primary school (文明学校). It was hosted inside a catholic church. In 1950, the school was migrated into a new shophouse. In 1951, a formal school building was completed. All the pupils from Wen Ming primary school were migrated into the new school building. At the same time, the school was renamed Yuk Kung primary school. In 1956, the school formally accepted subsidies from the Sarawak government. 
Pre-School
 Nanga Julau KEMAS Kindergarten
 Nanga Boa KEMAS Kindergarten
 Ejit KEMAS Kindergarten
 Bilat KEMAS Kindergarten
 Meluan KEMAS Kindergarten
 Entabai KEMAS Kindergarten
 Methodist Kindergarten

Primary School
The first school was started by Christian Missionaries. After the World War II, a Mission School called Roman Catholic Mission opened publicly in the 1930s. This school is the original of today's Julau St. Alphonsus Primary School or SK St. Alphonsus Julau (Primary School is also known as Sekolah Kebangsaan, SK).
In 1951, Julau's Chinese also want to start their own school which then called Julau Yuk Kung Chinese National-type School or SJK (C) Yuk Kung Julau (Chinese National-type School is also known asSekolah Jenis Kebangsaan Cina, SJK(C)).
The following years shows more primary schools are built, they are:
 Nanga Luau Primary School
 Nanga Merurun Primary School
 Kelangas Primary School
 Nanga Meluan Primary School
 Nanga Entabai Primary School
 Lubuk Assam Primary School
 Tapang Punggu Primary School
 Nanga Maong Primary School
 Nanga Ju Primary School
 Nanga Ensiring Primary School
 Nanga Jambu Primary School
 Nanga Serau Primary School
 Nanga Lasi Primary School

Secondary School
 Julau National High School or Sekolah Menengah Kebangsaan Julau (SMK Julau)
In 1966, SMK Julau started its operation in SK St. Alphonsus with only two classrooms. In 1970, SMK Julau moved to a new site which is the current site, Lembah Hilir Sungai Julau. The site was once belonged to Datuk Temenggong Banyang Anak Janting before he sold it to The State Government in 1968. On 22 March 1973, SMK Julau was officially launched by Yang Berhormat Tun Hussien Onn who was the Education Minister at the time.

SMK Julau did not provides any sixth form of secondary education, referred to as "Form 6". Students from Julau who want to continue their study in Form 6 to get a STPM's certificate have to either travel to the school in other districts such as SMK Meradong and SMK Bandar Bintangor by public bus or stay in hostel provided by those schools. 
 Sekolah Menengah Kebangsaan Julau No.2
SMK Julau No.2 was built to support the need of Julau people in education especially for those who come from rural area.

Healthcare

Clinic
 Julau Health Clinic
Before a clinic was built, Julau people need to go to the nearest clinic available, especially in Kanowit & Sarikei to get their medical needs. Currently, there is only one clinic established in Julau.

Culture and leisure

Attractions and recreational spots

There is a weekly Sunday market in Julau where people will gather here to sell a variety of agricultural products. Fort Brooke is located at Nanga Meluan, 24 km away from Julau Town. The Fort was built by the Brooke government to hinder the attacks by Ibans.

Notes

References

External links

 Blogspot : Kuang Kapong Homepage

Julau District
Towns in Sarawak